Anthemis aaronsohnii is a member of the daisy family and is found in Lebanon and Syria.

References

Anthemis